Un jour dans notre vie (A Day In Our Life) is the sixth studio album by French new wave band, Indochine. It was released in 1993 and is the follow-up album to Le baiser. It was released simultaneously in France and Canada with a limited release in Peru.

Track listing
 Savoure le rouge 4:23
 Sur les toits du monde 5:07
 Un jour dans notre vie 4:01
 Anne et moi 3:14
 La main sur vous 4:55
 Some Days 3:42
 Bienvenue chez les nus 4:07
 D'ici mon amour 4:44
 Candy prend son fusil 3:16
 Ultra S. 4:25
 Vietnam Glam 4:05
 Crystal Song Telegram 2:35

References

External links
 Detailed album information at www.indo-chine.org

1993 albums
Indochine (band) albums